Gmina Olesno may refer to either of the following administrative districts in Poland:
Gmina Olesno, Lesser Poland Voivodeship
Gmina Olesno, Opole Voivodeship